Robert Lawrence Middlekauff (July 5, 1929 – March 10, 2021) was a professor of colonial and early United States history at the University of California, Berkeley.

Career 
In 1983, Middlekauff became the President of Huntington Library, Art Collections and Botanical Gardens in San Marino, California, until 1987. He was elected to the American Academy of Arts and Sciences in 1984. In 1987, Middlekauff became a professor at UC Berkeley.

Middlekauff is best known for The Glorious Cause, a history of the American Revolutionary War, which was a finalist for the Pulitzer Prize in 1983.  He was the Harold Vyvyan Harmsworth Professor of American History in 1996-7. In 1997, he was elected to the American Philosophical Society in 1997.

Personal life 
He was born in Yakima, Washington. Middlekauff died at the age of 91 from complications of a stroke on March 10, 2021, in Pleasanton, California.

See also 

 Historiography of the United States

Bibliography
Ancients and Axioms: Secondary Education in Eighteenth-Century New England (New Haven: Yale University Press, 1963).
 The Mathers: Three Generations of Puritan Intellectuals, 1596-1728, winner of the Bancroft Prize. (Oxford: Oxford University Press, 1971) reprinted in paperback (Berkeley: University of California Press, 1999).
The Glorious Cause: The American Revolution, 1763-1789 (Oxford: Oxford University Press, 1982, paperback ed., 1986) (Revised and Expanded Edition, 2005).
Benjamin Franklin and His Enemies (Berkeley: University of California Press, 1996; paperback ed., 1998).

References

External links

1929 births
2021 deaths
Place of birth missing
University of California, Berkeley faculty
Historians of the American Revolution
Harold Vyvyan Harmsworth Professors of American History
People associated with the Huntington Library
Bancroft Prize winners
Historians from California
Members of the American Philosophical Society